Joseph Edward Karth (August 26, 1922 – May 29, 2005) was a U.S. Representative from Minnesota. He was a member of the Democratic Party.

Born in New Brighton, Ramsey County, Minnesota; all four of his grandparents were German immigrants. He attended public schools and the University of Nebraska School of Engineering; interrupted his education during the Second World War to serve in the United States Army, with service in the European Theater of Operations; employed by the Minnesota Mining & Manufacturing Company; international representative of OCAW-AFL-CIO 1947–1958; member of the Minnesota House of Representatives, 1950–1958; elected as a member of the Democratic-Farmer-Labor Party to the 86th, 87th, 88th, 89th, 90th, 91st, 92nd, 93rd, and 94th congresses, (January 3, 1959 – January 3, 1977); was not a candidate for reelection to the 95th Congress in 1976; established a consulting firm; died on May 29, 2005, in Scottsdale, Arizona.

References
Minnesota Legislators Past and Present
 Retrieved on 2008-02-18

External links

A Letter to USMC about UFOs written by Congressman Karth 1961
 The   Papers of Joseph E. Karth are available for research use at the Minnesota Historical Society.

1922 births
2005 deaths
Democratic Party members of the Minnesota House of Representatives
Military personnel from Minnesota
AFL–CIO people
United States Army personnel of World War II
American people of German descent
American Presbyterians
United States Army soldiers
Democratic Party members of the United States House of Representatives from Minnesota
20th-century American politicians
People from New Brighton, Minnesota